Kevin Lehane is an Irish screenwriter. In 2009, his speculative screenplay Grabbers was listed on the Brit List and in late 2010 it began production marking his feature film debut. In 2013, he was nominated for a Writers' Guild of Great Britain Award for Best First Feature  and an IFTA Award for his script to Grabbers at the 10th Annual Irish Film and Television Academy awards.

References

External links
 How to write a horror movie
 Heads Will Roll for Irish writer Kevin Lehane’s new film
 Kevin Lehane interview: Grabbers, Twitter, and filming in the rain
 Grabbers Writer Kevin Lehane Reveals His Take On Where A Grabbers 2 Could Go

External links

Irish screenwriters
Irish male screenwriters
Living people
Irish writers
People from County Cork
Year of birth missing (living people)